Parietal branch (a branch near the parietal bone) may refer to:
 parietal branch of superficial temporal artery
 parietal branch of the middle meningeal artery